James W. Murphy may refer to:

 James W. Murphy (politician) (1852–?), Wisconsin state legislator
 James William Murphy (1858–1927), United States Representative from Wisconsin
 James Murphy (soccer, born 1936), retired American soccer player
 James W. Murphy (horse trainer) (1926–2009), America racehorse trainer - namesake of the James W. Murphy Stakes